Kate Mailer (born August 18, 1962) is an American stage and film actress and daughter of American author-playwright Norman Mailer and third wife, journalist Lady Jeanne Campbell, daughter of the 11th Duke of Argyll and his first wife, The Honourable Janet Gladys Aitken. Her work includes roles on stage in the Anton Chekhov play The Cherry Orchard, and on film in Jean-Luc Godard's adaptation of the William Shakespeare play King Lear with Burgess Meredith (1987) and in W. T. Morgan's A Matter of Degrees with Arye Gross (1990). She has since become a writer.

References

External links
 
 New York Times Movies section filmography
 New York Times Theater section review of The Cherry Orchard

1962 births
American people of South African-Jewish descent
Jewish American actresses
Aitken family
Living people
21st-century American Jews
21st-century American women